Willie Finnigan (24 November 1912 – 23 April 2006) was a Scottish football player and coach, who played for Hibernian and Dunfermline Athletic. Finnigan appeared for Hibernian in the 1947 Scottish Cup Final and helped the club win the 1947–48 Scottish League championship. After leaving Hibs, Finnigan became a player/coach with Dunfermline, working for manager Webber Lees.

References

External links 
Willie Finnigan, www.ihibs.co.uk

1912 births
2006 deaths
Footballers from Edinburgh
Scottish footballers
Association football wing halves
Hibernian F.C. players
Dunfermline Athletic F.C. players
Scottish Football League players
Scottish Junior Football Association players